Dawson Creek Water Aerodrome, was located  southeast of Dawson Creek, British Columbia, Canada.

The airport was classified as an airport of entry by Nav Canada and was staffed by the Canada Border Services Agency (CBSA). CBSA officers at this airport were able handle general aviation aircraft only, with no more than 15 passengers.

See also
Dawson Creek Airport
Dawson Creek (Flying L Ranch) Airport

References

Defunct seaplane bases in British Columbia
Dawson Creek